Gamson is a surname. Notable people with the surname include:

Annabelle Gamson (born 1928), American dancer and choreographer
Arnold Gamson (born 1926), American conductor, particularly opera
David Gamson, keyboardist/musician, producer, songwriter, arranger, engineer
Stephen Gamson (born 1965), American artist and art collector
William A. Gamson (1934–2021), professor of sociology at Boston College

See also
Gambeson